Drug titration is the process of adjusting the dose of a medication for the maximum benefit without adverse effects.

When a drug has a narrow therapeutic index, titration is especially important, because the range between the dose at which a drug is effective and the dose at which side effects occur is small. Some examples of the types of drugs commonly requiring titration include insulin, anticonvulsants, blood thinners, anti-depressants, and sedatives.

Titrating off of a medication instead of stopping abruptly is recommended in some situations. Glucocorticoids should be tapered after extended use to avoid adrenal insufficiency.

Drug titration is also used in phase I of clinical trials. The experimental drug is given in increasing dosages until side effects become intolerable.  A clinical trial in which a suitable dose is found is called a dose-ranging study.

See also 
 Therapeutic drug monitoring

References 

Pharmacology